Wolgot Station is a railroad station on the Suin Line in Siheung, Gyeonggi Province, South Korea. It opened on 30 June 2012. There are many Seafood restaurants located near the station. When the Gyeonggang Line (Wolgot-Pangyo Line) opened, it will become a transfer station in the future.

Station Layout

External links

Railway stations opened in 2012
Seoul Metropolitan Subway stations
Metro stations in Siheung